Merrie Land is the second and final studio album by English art rock supergroup The Good, the Bad & the Queen. It was produced by Tony Visconti and released on 16 November 2018.

Promotion
The band announced the album with the single "Merrie Land" and news that they would embark on a five-date tour of the UK in early December 2018. In an interview for The Scotsman, Albarn commented that the album is "a reluctant goodbye letter” to the European Union following Brexit, and "a series of observations and reflections on Britishness in 2018." A video released for "Merrie Land" featured Albarn dressed as a ventriloquist's dummy singing and gesturing in front of a backdrop of pastoral images and English landscapes.

The band released the second single from the album, "Gun to the Head", on 5 November 2018. The track features "organ, bassoon, recorder, and a British Invasion-style ensemble pop hook [which] lend the song a cheery boardwalk shine, undercut by Albarn's knotty lyrics of conspiratorial and repressive governance." The video released for "Gun to the Head" also featured Albarn dressed as a ventriloquist's dummy, but with backup dummies and a black backdrop. Three additional "warm-up shows" for the band in late November 2018 were announced alongside the release of the second single and its video.

Recording
Sessions for the album started in January 2017, when Albarn, Simonon and Tong spent time in Blackpool, which was originally going to be its main focus. However, Albarn expanded the focus of the album over the next two years while touring with Gorillaz for the albums Humanz and The Now Now.

In an interview with The Guardian, the band members admitted that Merrie Land shares creative attributes with its predecessor, The Good, the Bad & the Queen, but stylistically the two are dissimilar. Simonon characterised Merrie Land as "modern English folk music with a bit of rub-a-dub in it" while Allen noted "this time around, people can dance". The interview, conducted by music critic John Harris, focused on the album's inspiration in the Brexit vote, and how that impacted the themes on Merrie Land. Where the band's first album was "murky" in its depiction of London, Merrie Land "[evokes] the contorted confusion of Brexit", and "widens its focus beyond the capital and has an even sharper sense of place." Simonon also highlighted the album's title as "kind of [alluding] to people's nostalgic, sentimental vision of how England used to be. And it never really existed."

Artwork
The cover of the album features a shot of Michael Redgrave from the 1945 horror movie Dead of Night, in which he plays a ventriloquist taken over by his dummy.

Personnel 

Adapted from the Albums Liner Notes. 
 Damon Albarn – lead vocal, lowery organ (2-8, 10, 11), piano (2, 3, 6-8, 11), recorder (3), mellotron (4, 7, 8, 10), theremin (4), arp quartet (5), farfisa (8), percussion (10), songwriting
 Paul Simonon – bass (all tracks), backing vocals, percussion (7), songwriting
 Simon Tong – guitar (all tracks), backing vocals, songwriting
 Tony Allen – drums (all tracks), songwriting
Gareth Humphrey – bassoon (2, 3, 8, 10)
Kate St. John – cor anglais (2, 9)  
Demon Strings – string quartett (2, 3, 4, 9-11) 
Gerry Diver – penny whistle (7) 
Tan Tan – trumpet (8) 
Chris Storr – trumpet (10, 11) 
Tony Visconti – producing, additional vocals (3), recorder (6, 7)
Michael Rose – saxophone (8)   
Lucas Petter – trombone (8)   
Stephen Sedgwick – mixing 
John Davis – mastering

Reception

Reviews for the album were mostly positive, with The Independent calling the album "entertaining and theatrical" and stating that its lyrics "capture the social observation of  Parklife", and Clash magazine labeling the album "curious twenty-first century folk about curious twenty-first century folk", adding that while Albarn's lyrics concerning Britain were a "proven formula", it was his collaboration with the rest of the band that made the album unique. At Metacritic, which assigns a normalised rating out of 100 to reviews from mainstream critics, the album received an average score of 77, indicating "generally favorable reviews". Some critics felt that the album was unfocused, with The Guardian stating that despite its rich instrumentation, its writing "never resolves into anything concrete". NME held a similar position, referring to it as "muddled" and stating that "beyond the title track and ‘Lady Boston’, it begins to wear thin quicker than a seagull nosediving to your soggy paper of chips". The Sunday Times named it ‘Album Of The Year’ for 2018 saying it is “…about England — Albarn perched, metaphorically, on the edge of the cliffs of Dover, his gaze focused not outwards but back, at a country he feels is about to plunge from them.”

Track listing

Sample credits
 "Introduction" contains a sample of dialogue from the film A Canterbury Tale, as directed by Michael Powell and Emeric Pressburger.

Charts

References

2018 albums
Albums produced by Tony Visconti
Albums produced by Damon Albarn
Albums recorded at Studio 13
The Clash
Parlophone albums
Concept albums
Collaborative albums
Damon Albarn albums